Mehalso Observatory  is an astronomical observatory owned and operated by Penn State Erie.  A gift from Dr. Robert Mehalso and his wife, Elizabeth, it is located in Erie, Pennsylvania (USA).

See also 
List of observatories

References

External links
Erie Clear Sky Clock Forecasts of observing conditions covering Mehalso Observatory.

Astronomical observatories in Pennsylvania